Raja Horil Singh was a prominent chieftain in the Indian state of Bihar in the 18th century and belonged to the Ujjainiya Rajput clan. He ruled in Mathila then moved to Dumraon. He was notorious for engaging in feuds with his own clansmen and assisting the Mughals in helping to put down their rebellions for which he was rewarded greatly. He also allied with fellow zamindars to assist in the defeat of Afghan invaders in 1734. His most notable act was being the  founder of the Dumraon Raj chieftaincy and zamindari.

References

History of Bihar
People from Bhojpur district, India
Rajput rulers